The Green Party (ZES) was a political party in Serbia, based in Novi Sad. The party also represented the Slovak minority in Serbia.

History
The party was established in 2014. In the 2016 parliamentary elections it won one seat in National Assembly, one seat in AP Vojvodina Assembly and seats in thirteen other city and municipal assemblies.

During the 2020 parliamentary elections it was part of "Let the masks fall" coalition, but failed to win a seat in the National Assembly.

Presidents

Election history

References

External links
Official website

2014 establishments in Serbia
Green political parties in Serbia
Political parties established in 2014
Slovak political parties in Serbia
Slovaks of Vojvodina